Matti Rantanen (born 13 February 1981) is a Finnish rally driver from Lammi.

Career 
Rantanen began rallying in 2003 in his native Finland. In 2004 and 2005 he competed in the Finnish Junior Rally Championship, and the main Finnish Rally Championship in 2005 and 2006. In 2005 he competed in his first World Rally Championship round on Rally Finland, winning the Group N category (for less powerful Group N cars). He repeated this feat in 2006, also winning the Group N class in the Finnish Rally Championship. He moved up to the Group N category in the Finnish championship in 2007, finishing sixth. He finished fourth in the following year, 2008. On the 2008 Rally Finland, Rantanen drove a Ford Focus WRC to seventh overall.

In 2009 Rantanen is competing in the British Rally Championship in a front-wheel-drive Renault Clio. He competed in the 2009 Rally Finland for the Munchi's Ford World Rally Team, in which he recorded his highest finish to date after finishing in fifth place overall.

Complete WRC results

JWRC results

SWRC results

References

External links 
 

Finnish rally drivers
World Rally Championship drivers
Living people
1981 births